is a passenger railway station in the city of Ichikawa, Chiba, Japan, operated by the third sector Hokusō Railway.

Lines

Station layout
This station consists of two opposing side platforms serving two tracks, located in a cutting below ground level, with the station building at ground level above.

Platforms

Adjacent stations

History
Kita-Kokubun Station opened on 31 March 1991. On 17 July 2010, a station numbering system was introduced to the Hokusō Line, with the station designated HS03.

Passenger statistics
In fiscal 2018, the station was used by an average of 4235 passengers daily.

Surrounding area
 Ichikawa History Museum
 Chiba University – Gardening Department

See also
 List of railway stations in Japan

References

External links

 Hokusō Line station information 

Railway stations in Chiba Prefecture
Hokusō Line
Railway stations in Japan opened in 1991
Ichikawa, Chiba